Styrax litseoides is a species of flowering plant in the genus Styrax and family Styracaceae. It is endemic to Vietnam.

References

litseoides
Endemic flora of Vietnam
Vulnerable plants
Taxonomy articles created by Polbot